Shimon Redlich (born 1935) is an Israeli historian and Holocaust survivor, professor emeritus at the Ben Gurion University, a specialist in the modern history of Jews in Eastern Europe, Russia and the USSR.

Biography
Shimon Redlich was born in Lviv, In 1935 the family moved to Brzezany (now Ukraine). In 1943 his fathewr was killed during a round-up, and the family went into hiding with the help of a Polish and a Ukrainian families. 

Redlich is one of the child survivors starring in the 1948 film  Unzere kinder.

In 1950 he emigrated to Israel. He earned BA at Hebrew University, MA from Harvard University and PhD from  New York University. In 1972 he began teaching at Ben Gurion University and retired as full professor in 2003

Works

References

1935 births
People from Berezhany
Holocaust survivors
Israeli historians
Historians of the Holocaust
Living people
Hebrew University of Jerusalem alumni
Harvard University alumni
New York University alumni
Academic staff of Ben-Gurion University of the Negev